Polyorchis, or bell jellies, is a genus of hydrozoans in the family Corynidae. They are transparent with red coloration in their internal organs and eye spots around the rim of their bell. The red pigmentation helps them camouflage. They are often found in harbors, marinas, and other calm waters close to shore. They feed on plankton and benthic crustaceans and are found near the sea floor. The bells can reach about 2.25 inches (5 cm).

P. pencillatus is nicknamed "red-eyed jellyfish". At the base of the tentacles are several eyes, called ocelli, which contain light-sensing cells and red pigments.

References

External links
 

Corynidae
Hydrozoan genera